The 2023 Cazoo Masters was the eleventh staging of the non-ranking Masters darts tournament, held by the Professional Darts Corporation. It was held from 27–29 January 2023 at the Marshall Arena in Milton Keynes, England.

Joe Cullen was the defending champion after beating Dave Chisnall 11–9 in the 2022 final, but he lost to Chris Dobey 6–4 in the first round.

Chris Dobey won his first televised title, defeating Rob Cross 11–7 in the final.

The second-round match between Rob Cross and Gary Anderson produced the highest losing and highest combined average in Masters history, with Cross' setting the 2nd highest average at the masters.

Qualifiers
The Masters featured the top 24 players in the PDC Order of Merit after the 2023 PDC World Darts Championship, with the top 8 automatically qualifying for the second round.

Danny Noppert, Damon Heta, Ross Smith, and Callan Rydz made their debuts in the event.

The following players took part in the tournament:

Prize money
The prize money was increased from £220,000 to £275,000 in total, with the winner earning £65,000.

Draw
The schedule was confirmed on 18 January.

References

Masters
Masters (darts)
Masters (darts)
Masters (darts)
Sport in Milton Keynes
2020s in Buckinghamshire